The Tyler Pro Classic (currently known as the Christus Health Pro Challenge for sponsorship purposes) is a tournament for professional female tennis players played on outdoor hard courts. The event is classified as a $80,000 ITF Women's Circuit tournament and has been held in Tyler, Texas, United States, since 2017.

Past finals

Singles

Doubles

External links 
 ITF search
 Official website

ITF Women's World Tennis Tour
Hard court tennis tournaments
Women's tennis tournaments in the United States
Recurring sporting events established in 2017
Tennis in Texas